National economy is the economic plan envisioned by Ziya Gökalp and carried out by successive Ottoman and Turkish governments, which involved the systematic dispossession of native Christian bourgeoisie (which primarily occurred as a result of the Armenian genocide and expulsion of Greeks) and their replacement by Muslim Turks, in addition to large-scale confiscation and redistribution of Christian-owned property. Türk Yurdu announced 1915 as the starting year of the national economy.  To Emil Ludwig, Talaat Pasha mentioned that the loss of the Armenian workforce would damage the economy for a short while, but that Turks would step in their positions and replace the Armenians soon.

Before the revolution, the Committee of Union and Progress held extremist views of the economy, for example advocating for boycotts against Armenian goods and shutting down the Public Debt Administration. Post revolutionary success gave way to a pragmatic economic policy. Other than encouragement of domestic production projects, the CUP largely followed a liberal economic policy to Mehmed Cavid's designs, resulting in a large increase in foreign investment between 1908 and 1913 despite the volatility of the Ottoman Empire's international standing.

However following the radicalization of the CUP post-Balkan Wars, the committee switched back to extremist rhetoric in the economy, advocating for Muslim Turkish domination of the economy at the expense of non-Muslim and non-domestic business. National Economy, "Millî İktisat", was a combination of corporatism, protectionism, and statist economic policies. This became a formal platform of CUP policy in their 1916 congress, whose goal was to create an indigenous Turkish-Muslim bourgeoisie and middle class. For the CUP, the way to kick start capitalism for the Turks was to seize capital from the well endowed Christians for themselves. To this end, pseudo-Marxist rhetoric was used against Armenian enterprise such as there being a "class struggle" and disproportionate ownership by Armenians of wealth that had to be shared with Muslims at all costs. Import substitution industrialization and property confiscation centralized of economic capital in the hands of "loyal" ethnic groups, which deepened political support for the CUP. When it came to foreign trade, previously well established liberal policy gave way to protectionism: tariffs were increased in 1914 from 8 to 11%, by 1915 they reached 30%.

The policies associated with National Economy were essential for the CUP's Türk Yurdu project that carried over to the later Republican People's Party regime, and created a fertile ground for the Republic of Turkey's industrialization post independence war.

Confiscation of Christian-owned property continued until the late twentieth century.

See also
Confiscation of Armenian properties in Turkey
Varlık Vergisi

References

Sources

Ayhan Aktar, “Homogenizing the Nation; Turkifying the Economy: Turkish Experience of Population Exchange Reconsidered,” in Crossing the Aegean: An Appraisal of the 1923 Compulsory Exchange between Greece and Turkey, ed. Renée Hirschon (New York and Oxford: Berghahn Books, 2003), 79–95.

 

 

Economic history of Turkey
Turkish nationalism